Gavarilla is a genus of Brazilian jumping spiders that was first described by G. R. S. Ruiz & Antônio Domingos Brescovit in 2006.

Species
 it contains only two species, found only in Brazil:
 Gavarilla arretada Ruiz & Brescovit, 2006 – Brazil (Maranhão)
 Gavarilla ianuzziae Ruiz & Brescovit, 2006 – Brazil (Sergipe)

References

Salticidae genera
Sitticini
Spiders of Brazil